Dese Bones G'wine Rise Again is an American Negro spiritual that tells the story of the expulsion of Adam and Eve from the Garden of Eden.

In this spiritual, a caller tells the story in rhymed couplets; each line of the couplet is followed by the final line of an abbreviated chorus sung in answer by the audience or congregation.  Between each couplet, a complete chorus is sung. In the example below, the sung chorus is given in italics; the other words are the caller's lyrics:

De Lawd, He thought He’d make a man
Dese bones gwine rise again
Made ‘im outa mud an’ a han’ful o’ san
Dese bones gwine to rise again

(Chorus)

I knowed it Indeed I knowed it, brother
I knowed it Dese bones gwine to rise again

There are several variants of the lyrics; the dramatic and creative talents of the caller generate considerable variation.  For one version of the lyrics, see the external link below.

References

African-American cultural history
American folk songs
Year of song unknown
Songwriter unknown
Cultural depictions of Adam and Eve